Nicole Maree "Nikki" Garrett (born 8 January 1984) is an Australian professional golfer.

Garrett turned professional in late 2005, and qualified for the 2006 Ladies European Tour (LET).  She did not win a tournament in her rookie season, but she had four top-ten finishes, ended up 12th on the Order of Merit standings with €99,445 in earnings, and won the 2006 Ryder Cup Wales Rookie of the Year award. In 2007, she collected back to back LET titles at the Tenerife Ladies Open and the Open de Espana Femenino.

Professional wins (2)

Ladies European Tour wins (2)
2007 (2) Tenerife Ladies Open, Open De España Femenino

Ladies European Tour career summary

Team appearances
Amateur
Queen Sirikit Cup (representing Australia): 2005

Professional
World Cup (representing Australia): 2007, 2008
The Queens (representing Australia): 2015

External links
 
 
 

Australian female golfers
Ladies European Tour golfers
ALPG Tour golfers
People from New South Wales
1984 births
Living people